John Odom may refer to:

 Blue Moon Odom, baseball pitcher
 John Odom (baseball), minor league pitcher notable for being traded for ten baseball bats